Donji Lukavac may refer to the following places:

 Donji Lukavac, Gradačac
 Donji Lukavac, Nevesinje